Marco Dell'Uomo (born 14 November 1961) is an Italian former freestyle swimmer who competed in the 1984 Summer Olympics. He was born in Rome.

References

1961 births
Living people
Swimmers from Rome
Italian male freestyle swimmers
Olympic swimmers of Italy
Swimmers at the 1984 Summer Olympics
Swimmers at the 1983 Mediterranean Games
Mediterranean Games gold medalists for Italy
Mediterranean Games medalists in swimming